Pitersky District is an administrative and municipal district (raion), one of the thirty-eight in Saratov Oblast, Russia. It is located in the south of the oblast. Its administrative center is the rural locality (a selo) of Piterka. Population: 18,054 (2010 Census);  The population of the administrative center accounts for 30.1% of the district's total population.

References

Notes

Sources

Districts of Saratov Oblast